Jordan Izaak Pundik (born October 12, 1979) is an American musician and songwriter. He is a founding member and the frontman of Floridian rock band New Found Glory, for whom he sings lead vocals and contributes lyrics. He was also the guitarist in the band's now-defunct side project, the International Superheroes of Hardcore, where he performed under the pseudonym of "Chugga Chugga".

Biography

Jordan Pundik was born in Englewood, New Jersey, to Carlos and Maureen Pundik. His family moved to Pompano Beach, Florida, when he was 5 years old. He has a brother named Daniel and a sister named Edra. He learned how to play guitar when he was 15 years old. Outside of the band, he is also a tattoo artist.

Musical career
The origins of the band New Found Glory date back to the summer of 1997 when Pundik met Steve Klein at Marjory Stoneman Douglas High School and the pair began writing music together. Pundik later stated the band name was created whilst he and Klein were working in Red Lobster together.  Pundik says, "We came up with A New Found Glory, we wrote it on a napkin. I think we pulled some of it from 'A Newfound Interest in Massachusetts' by the Get Up Kids". They recruited friend Ian Grushka on bass, who they had previously played with in a band named "Inner City Kids". The band practiced in Grushka's garage, and later invited Joe "Taco Joe" Marino to play drums. Shortly thereafter, Chad Gilbert (lead guitar), former vocalist of Shai Hulud, joined to complete the quintet.

In addition to his work with New Found Glory, Pundik has also collaborated with many artists. His vocals also appear on the tracks "Kings of Hollywood" and "You're Not Alone" on MxPx's 2003 release Before Everything & After. He did backup vocals for the song "Cat Like Thief" by Box Car Racer along with Tim Armstrong of Rancid. Jordan also appears on the Hope After the End/A Stab In The Dark split EP with Ned Harrington. 

In 2004, he appeared on the Breakdance Vietnam song "Graves of Mistakes" from the album Memories of Better Days, released on Broken Sounds Records. Jordan also contributed vocals on "You're the Wanker, If Anyone Is" by Say Anything alongside bandmate Chad Gilbert. Jordan also contributed vocals on the b-side track titled "The Lost Boys" by Set Your Goals. Jordan is also featured in the band Midtown's music video "Just Rock & Roll". In 2010, Pundik collaborated with Paramore's Hayley Williams and Relient K's Ethan Luck for a punk rock cover of "The Bed Intruder Song".

In 2012, his "suburban punk" band Domestikated (consisting of himself and Relient K's Ethan Luck) released an EP called 5 Minutes in Timeout!. The EP also features a collaboration with Hayley Williams, on the track "What's His Name" (feat. Becca).

Influences
Pundik has stated that Nirvana and Green Day are his biggest inspirations.

Discography

with New Found Glory

1997: It's All About the Girls (EP)
1999: Nothing Gold Can Stay
2000: From the Screen to Your Stereo (EP)
2000: New Found Glory
2002: Sticks and Stones
2004: Catalyst
2006: Coming Home
2007: From the Screen to Your Stereo Part II
2008: Hits
2008: Tip of the Iceberg (EP)
2009: Not Without a Fight
2011: Radiosurgery
2014: Resurrection
2017: Makes Me Sick
2019: From the Screen to your Stereo Part III
2020: Forever and Ever x Infinity

with International Superheroes of Hardcore

2008: Takin' it Ova!
2008: HPxHC (EP)

Record labels
with New Found Glory
Fiddler Records (1997)
Eulogy Records (1999)
Drive-Thru Records/Geffen Records (2000 – 2007)
Bridge 9 Records (2008 – 2009)
Epitaph Records (2009 – 2014)
Hopeless Records (2014 – present)

References

1979 births
Living people
People from Pompano Beach, Florida
Musicians from Coral Springs, Florida
American male singer-songwriters
American rock singers
American rock songwriters
American lyricists
American punk rock guitarists
American rock guitarists
American male guitarists
J. P. Taravella High School alumni
People from Oceanside, California
Rhythm guitarists
Singer-songwriters from California
Singer-songwriters from Florida
Guitarists from California
Guitarists from Florida
21st-century American singers
21st-century American guitarists
21st-century American male singers
New Found Glory members
People from Englewood, New Jersey